Canoga Park is a scripted Playboy TV comedy show set in a fictional Adult movie studio called American Insertions.

History
Created by Travis Draft and Nick Thomas, Canoga Park was a rated-R sitcom (think The Office meets Boogie Nights) that aired on Playboy TV.

The name Canoga Park is based on the real city of Canoga Park in California's San Fernando Valley. It was chosen as a humorous reference to the area's reputation for housing numerous Adult film studios.

References

External links

Canoga Park Official Site

Playboy TV original programming
Canoga Park, TV
Television series by Playboy Enterprises
Television shows set in Los Angeles
2000s American comedy television series
2007 American television series debuts
2007 American television series endings